Jitiya (also called Jivitputrika) is a three-day-long Hindu festival which is celebrated from the seventh to ninth lunar day of Krishna-Paksha in Ashwin month. It is celebrated mainly in the Indian states of Uttar Pradesh, Bihar and Jharkhand and the country of Nepal  as well as Nepali people of West Bengal. Mothers fast (without water) for well being of their children. It is celebrated for eight days in Jharkhand from first moon day to eight moon day in the first half of Ashwin month.

Rituals

Uttar pradesh and Bihar
It is a three day long festival.
 Nahai-Khai : The first day is Nahai-Khai, where mothers eat food only after taking bath. The food has to be vegetarian, prepared with ghee and pink salt.
 Khur-Jitiya or Jiviputrika day: This is the second day and mothers observe strict fasting without drinking water.
 Parana: This is the third day when mothers break fasting. Variety of delicacies are prepared such as Curry Rice, Noni (portulaca oleracea) saag and Marua(Eleusine coracana) Roti

Jharkhand
In the state of Jharkhand, it is known as Jitiya and people celebrate it for eight days. It start on the first day of Ashwin month. Pani bharwa of the village announces the starting of the Jitiya festival in Purnima. The next day, women collect sand from the river in a bamboo basket in the early morning so that no one can see them and put eight types of seeds, such as rice, gram, corn etc. They sing songs for eight days and don't eat onion, garlics, meat. On the seventh day, they put foods for jackles and eagles on the bank of a river after bathing. They fast and eat eight types of vegetables, rice of Arua and madua roti in the evening. They fast on the eighth day. On the eighth day, they plant a branch of Jitiya (Sacred fig) in the courtyard or Akhra. They prepare Pua, Dhooska and put eight types of vegetables, flowers and fruits in a basket. They worship Jitiya branch, listening to the story of Jitvahan from Brahmin and ask Jitiya (Jitvahan) for a long life for their children. They sing songs and do Jhumar dance the whole night. On the next day, they emmerse the branches of sacred fig tree in a river or stream, bath and put flower garland on the neck of their child.

Legend 
According to a story, Jimutvahan was king of Gandharvas. He gave up his kingdom to his brothers and went to forest to serve his father. He married malayavati. Once he saw an old woman mourning. She told him that she belongs to Nagvanshi (family of snakes). Due to an oath she has to offer her only son Sankhchuda to Garuda tomorrow to feed. Jimutvahan promised to protect her only son. Next day he lay on a bed of rocks and offered himself to Garuda. Garuda came and attacked Jimutvahan with his claws. Jimutvahan stayed calm and then Garuda stopped attacking. Garuda inquired about his identity and then Jimutvahan narrated the entire story. Impressed by his kindness and benevolence, Garuda promised that he will not take any sacrifices from Nagvanshis. To cherish this legend mothers keep fast for the wellbeing of their children.

This story is similar to Nagananda (The Joy of the Snakes), a Sanskrit play written by Emperor Harsha in the 7th century CE where Vidyadara king  Jimutvahana sacrifices his life for Naga to Garuda. According to the story, Jimutaketu was king of snow clad mountain country of Vidyadhara. In his house, there was a heaven-sent wishing tree, the legecy of his forefathers. He had no son, so he asked the tree for a son. Then a child was born and he named him Jimutvahan. He was full of compassion for all living beings. He spoke to his father and asked the wishing tree to banish poverty and give wealth to men. Then the tree sent gold showers on the earth and all men rejoiced. The fame of Jimutvahan extended far and wide.
Even king Jimutaketu filled with hatred as the throne was firmly fixed by his son's glory. They wanted to seize the place where a wishing tree grows, bent on war. Then Jimutvahan gave up fighting for Thorne with relatives and left the forest with his father and mother for the Malaya mountains. This was the place of Siddha, the prince. He wished to marry his sister Malayavati with Jimutvahan and Jimutvahan married her. In the past life, Jimutvahan was Vidyadhara and Malayavati was his wife. Once he saw a women crying. The son of women, Sankhchuda, tells him that they are Nagas and the serpent king sent him to the rock of death. Sankhachuda told him that the Garuda son of Vinata started to kill nagas after getting a nector from Vishnu, as in the past Kadru made Vinata a slave. Garuda started eating snakes. Then the king of Snakes, Vasuki, foresaw the destruction of serpents and made a pact with Garuda to send one snake each day. Jimutvahan placed himself on the rock of death. Then Garuda came and the earth began to tremble. Garuda bore Jimutvahan away with his beak and started to eat. Then rain of flowers started to fall from heaven. Garuda wondered after this incident and stopped eating Jimutvahan. Garuda tells Jimutvahan that he is not a snake but Jimutvahan tells him that he is a snake. Then Sankhachuda told him that he was a sanke and Jimutvahan was not. Garuda realised that Jimutvahan was not sanke but king of Vidhyadhar and filled with gulit. Jimutvahan told Garuda to not eat any snakes further. Then Garuda goes to bring the nectar from the heaven to heal the wounds of Jimutvahan and bring back the life of Snakes whose bones lies in rock. Then Guari came from heaven and sprinkled the nectar on the feet of Jimutvahan. The Garuda came and sprinkled the nectar and the snakes again became alive with clothes. Then all the snakes and the mother , father and wife of Jimutvahan came and praised him. Then Jimutvahan reigned Vidhyadhara.

References

External links

Hindu festivals
Festivals in Bihar
Festivals in Jharkhand
Women's festivals
Religious festivals in India
Hindu festivals in Nepal
Nagpuri culture
Culture of Madhesh
Culture of Koshi Province